Diana Louise DeGette (born July 29, 1957) is an American lawyer and politician serving as the U.S. representative for  since 1997. A member of the Democratic Party, her district is based in Denver. DeGette was a Chief Deputy Whip from 2005 to 2019 and is the dean of Colorado's congressional delegation; she served as the Colorado State Representative for the 6th district from 1993 until her election to the U.S. House.

Early life, education and career
A fourth-generation Coloradan, DeGette was born in Tachikawa, Japan, the daughter of Patricia Anne (née Rose) and Richard Louis DeGette. Her parents were American, and at the time of her birth her father was serving in the armed forces. She graduated from Colorado College, where she earned a B.A. in political science and was elected to the Pi Gamma Mu international honor society in 1979. She earned a Juris Doctor degree from New York University School of Law in 1982. She then returned to Denver and began a law practice focusing on civil rights and employment litigation.

Colorado Legislature
Long active in Denver politics, DeGette was elected to the Colorado House of Representatives in 1992. She was reelected in 1994 and chosen as assistant minority leader. She authored a law that guarantees Colorado women unobstructed access to abortion clinics and other medical care facilities, also known as the Bubble Bill. The United States Supreme Court found the Bubble Bill constitutional in Hill v. Colorado, 530 U.S. 703 (2000). DeGette also authored the state Voluntary Cleanup and Redevelopment Act, a model for similar cleanup programs.

U.S. House of Representatives

Elections

1996
Longtime 1st district Representative Pat Schroeder chose not to run for a 13th term in 1996, prompting DeGette to run. Her principal opponent in the primary election was former City Council member Tim Sandos, whom Denver Mayor Wellington Webb endorsed shortly before the primary. DeGette won the primary with 55% of the vote, all but assuring her of election in the heavily Democratic district (the 1st has been in Democratic hands for all but four years since 1933). Schroeder, who stayed neutral during the primary, endorsed DeGette once DeGette became the nominee. DeGette won with 57% of the vote and has been reelected 13 times since.

2006

DeGette defeated Green Party nominee Tom Kelly.

2008

DeGette defeated Republican nominee George Lilly, Libertarian nominee Martin Buchanan, and Independent Gary Swing.

2010

DeGette defeated Republican nominee Mike Fallon, Green nominee Gary Swing, American Constitutional Party nominee Chris Styskal, and Libertarian nominee Clint Jones.

2012

DeGette defeated Republican nominee Danny Stroud, Libertarian nominee Frank Atwood, and Green Party nominee Gary Swing. She won 68.23% of the vote.

2014

DeGette defeated Republican nominee Martin Walsh, Libertarian nominee Frank Atwood, UNA nominee Danny Stroud, and two write-in candidates. She won 65.81% of the vote.

2016

DeGette defeated Republican nominee Charles "Casper" Stockham, and Libertarian nominee Darrell Dinges. She won 257,254 votes, 67.87% of the total.

2018

DeGette defeated Republican nominee Charles Stockham and Libertarian nominee Raymon Doane. She won 272,886 votes, 73.8% of the total.

2020

DeGette defeated Republican nominee Shane Bolling, Libertarian nominee Kyle Furey, Unity nominee Paul Noel Fiorino, and Approval Voting nominee Jan Kok. DeGette won 331,621 votes, 73.6% of the total.

2022

DeGette defeated Republican nominee Jennifer Qualteri, Libertarian nominee John Kittleson, and Green nominee Iris Boswell. DeGette won 226,929 votes, 80.3% of the total.

Tenure 
DeGette serves as the co-chair of both the Congressional Diabetes Caucus and Pro-Choice Caucus, and she is Vice Chair of the LGBT Equality Caucus. With the Democrats' victory in the 2006 midterm elections, DeGette briefly considered running for House Majority Whip, but bowed out in favor of Jim Clyburn of South Carolina.

DeGette sat as speaker pro tempore and presided over the debate on December 18, 2019, the day United States House of Representatives voted on the first impeachment of President Donald Trump.

DeGette received national attention in 2005, when the House of Representatives passed legislation she cosponsored to lift President George W. Bush's limits on federal funding for embryonic stem cell research. DeGette, who had been working on the measure since 2001, enlisted the support of Representative Michael N. Castle (Republican from Delaware), who became DeGette's principal Republican cosponsor of the legislation. The DeGette-Castle bill passed the Senate on July 18, 2006. President Bush vetoed the bill the next day — his first veto.

In 2007, DeGette served as the House Democrats' designated whip on the bill reauthorizing the State Children's Health Insurance Program (HR 3162).  Although President Bush announced his opposition to the legislation, the House passed the bill on August 1, 2007, by a vote of 225 to 204.  The Senate adopted a different version of the legislation the next day.

DeGette was also a cosponsor for the Udall Amendment to the House Energy Bill, which the House approved by a vote of 220 to 190 on August 4, 2007. The Amendment creates a national Renewable Energy Standard that requires electric suppliers to produce 15 percent of their energy from renewable sources, 4 percent of which can come from efficiency, by the year 2020.

On September 12, 2007, DeGette announced that she would introduce the Colorado Wilderness Act of 2007 in Congress. The bill was unsuccessful and did not pass the committee level. She reintroduced the bill in 2009.

DeGette is a cosponsor of legislation to provide the District of Columbia voting representation.
On January 24, 2007, Speaker Nancy Pelosi appointed Representative DeGette to the House Page Board.

On November 26, 2007, DeGette announced her endorsement of Senator Hillary Clinton for president and was named national co-chair of Clinton's Health Care Policy Task Force and adviser on stem-cell research. DeGette was a superdelegate to the Democratic National Convention in Denver in August 2008.

DeGette was strongly critical of the Stupak-Pitts Amendment, which places limits on taxpayer-funded abortions (except in the case of rape, incest, or life of the mother) in the context of the November 2009 Affordable Health Care for America Act.

On January 12, 2021, Degette was named an impeachment manager for the second impeachment of President Trump.

Committee assignments
Committee on Energy and Commerce
Subcommittee on Energy
Subcommittee on Environment and Economy
Subcommittee on Oversight and Investigations (chair)
Committee on Natural Resources
Subcommittee on Energy and Mineral Resources
Subcommittee on National Parks, Forests and Public Lands

Caucus memberships
 Congressional Arts Caucus
 Arts Caucus
 Pro-Choice Caucus (co-chair)
 Privacy Caucus (co-chair)
 Children’s Caucus
 Congressional Brain Injury Caucus
 Congressional Children’s Health Caucus
 Congressional Cystic Fibrosis Caucus
 Congressional Multiple Sclerosis Caucus
 Diabetes Caucus (co-chair)
 Down Syndrome Caucus
 Food Safety Caucus
 French Caucus
 Internet Caucus
 LGBT Equality Caucus (vice chair)
 National Landscape Conservation System (NLCS) Caucus
 Natural Gas Caucus
 Public Broadcasting Caucus
 Recycling Caucus
 Renewable Energy and Energy Efficiency Caucus
 Women’s Caucus
Congressional Progressive Caucus

Party leadership
Chief Deputy Whip (110th, 111th, 112th Congresses)

Political positions

Abortion

DeGette is pro-choice and the co-chair of the Pro-Choice Caucus. DeGette and her former fellow co-chair, Louise Slaughter, are the sponsors of the Prevention First Act. This act aims to decrease the number of unintended pregnancies, abortions and sexually transmitted diseases through better women's healthcare. The NARAL Pro-Choice America PAC endorsed DeGette and gave her a 100% approval rating based on her positions. DeGette also received a 100% rating from Planned Parenthood. The National Right to Life Committee gave her a 0% rating due to her strong pro-choice stance.

Embryonic stem cell research
DeGette has consistently voted in favor of the use of embryonic stem cell research. DeGette says "we must pass common-sense embryonic stem cell research legislation, placing these regulations into statute and once and for all, ensuring this critical life-saving research can be conducted for years to come, unimpeded by political whims or naysayers." DeGette and Charlie Dent introduced the bipartisan Stem Cell Research Act of 2011, which would provide lasting support for stem cell research.

Gun control
DeGette supports bans on semi-automatic firearms like those used in the 2012 Aurora, Colorado shooting, which happened in a movie theater near her district. DeGette has stated that "the sole purpose of these guns and these magazines is to kill people." DeGette and Carolyn McCarthy introduced the Stop Online Ammunition Sales Act of 2012. The Brady Campaign endorsed DeGette's reelection in 2008, 2010, and 2012.

In 2013, DeGette drew national attention after making an erroneous statement at a public forum about firearm magazine restrictions. She stated, “[t]hese are ammunition, they’re bullets, so the people who have those now, they’re going to shoot them, so if you ban them in the future, the number of these high-capacity magazines is going to decrease dramatically over time because the bullets will have been shot and there won’t be any more available.” (Id.) The comment, failing to take into account the fact that these magazines are designed to be reloaded, fueled long-running complaints by gun-rights groups that lawmakers trying to regulate firearms do not understand the issue. (Id.)

In June 2016, DeGette and other Democratic lawmakers, led by John Lewis (D-GA) took part in a sit-in on the floor of the House of Representatives to protest the Republican leadership’s decision to not put several proposed gun control bills up for a vote.

Personal life
DeGette is married to attorney Lino Lipinsky. They live in Denver and have two daughters together. DeGette sings in her church choir.

Books
Diana DeGette, Sex, Science, and Stem Cells: Inside the Right Wing Assault on Reason, The Lyons Press (August 4, 2008),

See also
 Women in the United States House of Representatives

References

External links

Congresswoman Diana DeGette official U.S. House website
Diana DeGette for Congress campaign website 

1957 births
21st-century American politicians
21st-century American women politicians
American Presbyterians
American women lawyers
Colorado College alumni
Colorado lawyers
Female members of the United States House of Representatives
Living people
Democratic Party members of the United States House of Representatives from Colorado
Democratic Party members of the Colorado House of Representatives
New York University School of Law alumni
People from Tachikawa
Politicians from Denver
Women state legislators in Colorado
American gun control activists